Fibrin monomers are monomers of fibrin which are formed by the cleavage of fibrinogen by thrombin. Levels of fibrin monomers in can be measured using blood tests and can serve as a marker of in vivo fibrinogenesis and coagulation activation. They may be useful in the evaluation hypercoagulability.

Levels of fibrin monomers may be increased with pregnancy and by estrogen-containing combined birth control pills.

References

Blood proteins
Coagulation system